Calabrese is an American rock band that is based out of Phoenix, Arizona. The band consists of three faux brothers; Bobby Calabrese on guitar and vocals, Jimmy Calabrese on bass and vocals, and Davey Calabrese on Drums. Calabrese has been described as "Melodic, hook-laden, catchy, fun, Rock with a Punk attitude”. They have cited other bands such as the Damned, Alkaline Trio, Black Flag, Black Sabbath, Turbonegro, the Misfits, the Hives, White Zombie/Rob Zombie, AFI, Danzig, Type O Negative, and the Ramones as influences.

History

Origins
The three “brothers” were originally raised in the rural town of Antioch, Illinois in a large family of Italian American heritage. Jimmy Calabrese, the oldest of the trio, developed a fascination with horror and fictional monsters at an early age through a friend. Jimmy recalled in his blog how after the violent suicide of a local boy, paranormal activity was witnessed and investigated by him and a group of friends via the use of a ouija board. Afterward, their house was supposedly haunted, plagued by a foul smell, and had a demonic figure appear in a door. The hauntings reportedly stopped after the family moved to Arizona. Through Jimmy, Bobby was introduced to punk rock, metal and rock and roll music.

The two brothers both played bass and were separately active in a handful of local bands. In 2002, after completing film school at Columbia College, Jimmy decided the two should form their own band. Bobby switched to electric guitar and the two recruited the then sixteen-year-old Davey Calabrese, their youngest brother, to play drums.

On May 13, 2022 an announcement from Jimmy Calabrese stated he had left the band to retire.

Midnight Spookshow

In 2003, the band self-released the EP, "Midnight Spookshow". The EP received positive reviews from underground and indie publications from around the world. Michigan-area artist Tony O'Farell was hired to do the artwork. Aaron Carey (pipelineaudio) recorded the "Midnight Spookshow" EP at Studio Z in Phoenix Arizona. The EP was mastered by Andrew Davenport at Edgeworth Studios, New Zealand, making this a truly international affair from the start.

13 Halloweens

Though retaining their original punk rock sound, "13 Halloweens" displayed a foray into a more professional quality for the band that includes catchy melodies, AFI-like wails, heavier bass and drums. Canadian artist Andrew Barr was hired for the album's artwork. A music video for "Backseat of my Hearse" was directed by local filmmaker J.D. Smith. Subsequently, the band was approached by several indie labels, including an exclusive deal with Antidote Records. The band declined the offers and instead decided to again self-release their first full-length album through their recently created record label, Spookshow Records. For the title, the band held a contest to name their next album. The winning title was "13 Halloweens," sent in by Tempe fan Kurt Havelock under the name Nil Failstorm.

The Traveling Vampire Show

One year later the band released their second full-length album, The Traveling Vampire Show. The album features the artwork of Tom Bagley (of the Canadian rock band, The Forbidden Dimension) and Andrew Barr. The Traveling Vampire Show continued the sound of 13 Halloweens in many ways and explored in more detail the topics of the paranormal, vampirism, and the occult.

The music videos Voices of the Dead and Vampires Don't Exist were directed by famed comic book writer and film director Brian Pulido. Voices of the Dead was shot at Collins College Studio in Tempe, AZ and premiered on March 1, 2007 at Chandler Cinemas after a live performance by the band. The video for Vampires Don't Exist was used to promote Pulido's latest movie, The Graves which aired on the SyFy channel.

They Call Us Death

On "They Call Us Death," Calabrese's metal and punk rock roots shine bright. With faster tempos and harder vocals, Calabrese continues to grow as songwriters. "They Call Us Death" is harder, heavier and darker than their previous albums. The Calabrese brothers have developed a much more mature style with this album. Bobby Calabrese has stated that the band was influenced by THE DEAD BOYS, THE STOOGES, The Damned, The Cult and MOTÖRHEAD a lot on this album. The album was released March 20, 2010 on Spookshow Records.

Dayglo Necros

"Dayglo Necros" not only continues their legacy as one of the most consistently badass punk bands around, but it also manages to up their game, displaying their continued improvement – both upon the genre and as musicians. Following in the footsteps of their last album, "They Call Us Death," the music of "Dayglo Necros" is hard, fast, and furious, and yet manages, at times, to keep the spirit and the "whoa-oh-ohs" of their earlier efforts, "13 Halloweens" and "The Traveling Vampire Show." This melding of the earlier, poppier sounds of their first releases with the harder sound of their more recent work. "Dayglo Necros" was released July 1, 2012 on Spookshow Records. For the title, the band held a contest to name this album. The winning title was sent in by Eric Blair from the horror-punk band, Mummula. It was inspired by the vibrant colors of the album art.

Born With a Scorpion's Touch

Calabrese ups the ante and adds so much raw emotion into "Born With A Scorpion's Touch." Every piece of the album was strategic and fit perfectly together. The instrumentals were up-tempo and hard-hitting enough to make you feel like you're in a mosh pit. The vocals and the lyrics were catchy and meshed well with each song. They varied their rock styles across the whole album, from punk rock to metal to pure rock n' roll, with such finesse and without skipping a beat. "Born With A Scorpion's Touch" was released October 1, 2013.

Lust For Sacrilege

"Lust For Sacrilege" is Calabrese’s sixth full-length album, released under Spookshow Records. Containing elements of punk, blues, garage, goth, and straight-up rock and roll; Lust For Sacrilege doesn’t leave the familiar sounds of Calabrese. This album enters new territory inspired by Danzig, Black Sabbath, and Mastodon .Adding new instruments such as keyboards and synthesizers, Calabrese has been able to create a darker, heavier, and gritter sound enjoyed by old and new fans alike. "Lust For Sacrilege" was released on January 12, 2015.

Discography
 Midnight Spookshow EP (2003)
 13 Halloweens (2005)
 The Traveling Vampire Show (2007)
 Calabrese III: They Call Us Death (2010)
 Dayglo Necros (2012)
 Born with a Scorpion's Touch (2013)
 Lust for Sacrilege (2015)
 Flee the Light (2019)

Music compilations
 Hellnight-O-Rama 2
 HorrorPunk Compilation Volume 2: The Resurrection
 P.A.I.N. Soundtrack Vol. 1
 Too Much Horror Business 1977-1983: A Tribute to the Misfits 1977-1983 - "Night of the Living Dead"
 AZPunk.Comp V2 (2003)
 AZPunk.Comp V3 (2004)
 Horror of it All Vol. 1 (2005)
 This Is HorrorPunk Vol. 2 (2005)
 Ghouls Gone Wild (2006)
 Horror of it All Vol. 2 (2006)
 The Morgue The Merrier (2006)
 Rebels Of Rock N Roll No. 1 (2008)
 Horror High Presents Prom Queen Massacre (2006)

Movie soundtracks
 Horror Film: The Movie
 Zombie Punks from Beyond the Grave
 Prison-A-Go-Go! (2003)
 Chainsaw Sally (2004)
 Hoodoo for Voodoo (2006)
 No. My Other Possessed-Zombie Girlfriend. (2006)
 Blood on the Highway (2008)
 Cabras (2009-Unreleased)
 The Graves (As Seen on the SyFy Channel)(2010)
 No. My Other Possessed-Zombie Girlfriend
 Hack Job

References

External links
 
 

American death rock groups
Punk rock groups from Arizona
Horror punk groups
Musical groups established in 2003
Sibling musical trios
American musical trios